The Ultimate Gift is a Christmas album by American R&B/soul singer Rahsaan Patterson, his fifth studio album released under Artistry Music in 2008. Patterson and Jamey Jaz co-wrote and co-produced seven of the tracks, Van Hunt along with Patterson co-producing, "Christmas at My House".

Track listing

Charts

References

External links
 http://www.not-of-this-world.com/site.html

2008 Christmas albums
Christmas albums by American artists
Rahsaan Patterson albums
Artistry Music albums
Contemporary R&B Christmas albums